Luísa Mahin (born in the early 19th century) was a historical controversial character and a former slave of African origin. She is thought as someone who would have taken part in the articulation of the slave uprisings that shook the Province of Bahia in the first decades of the nineteenth century. She was a major player and strategist in the Malê Revolt where she helped inform others involved in Arabic.

There were, however, no historical indication of her participation in the revolts, which leads some historians to consider her a kind of alter ego of the activist writer Luís Gama.

Biography 
Her origins are uncertain. It is not known whether she was born in Costa da Mina, in Africa, or in Bahia. A member of the Maí people, from which her surname comes, Luísa Mahin bought her freedom in 1812. She had a son, poet and abolitionist Luís Gama, who described her as a short, thin, pretty woman with "white as snow" teeth, haughty, generous, suffering and vengeful.

References

External links 

 Biography
19th-century Brazilian women
Slave rebellions in Brazil
19th-century slaves
Brazilian rebel slaves